Gerani is a local community of the Rethymno Municipality in the  Rethymno (regional unit) of the region of Crete established by Kallikratis reform. Previously, it was part of municipality of Nikiforos Fokas. Capital of the new municipality is Rethymno.

Geography, origin of name, history 
Gerani is located 7.5 km west of  Rethymno and in a short distance from the new national road Rethymnon-Chania, at an altitude of 90 meters.  Gerani (in Greek) refers to a pump used in the old days to draw water from a well. Such a well existed in the village. The village was occupied by the Ottomans
Population of   Gerani

Sights 
The Gerani Cave  was discovered in 1968 during the construction of the new national road Rethymno-Chania. The 6 halls of this cave display magnificent stalagmites. Archaeological research within the cave has brought to light a variety of findings dating back to the Neolithic period. Some of this findings are exhibited in the Archeological Museum of Rethymno 
Furthermore, important material of palaeontological interest was found, dating  back to the end of the Pleistocene period.

Daily life, Festivities 
"Parade of the Camel" takes place in the village (Ash Monday)

Miscellaneous
There is public bus service (KTEL) from Rethymno ( three services, morning and noon on weekdays and not weekends)  

Since 28 March 2005 the area of Gerani is included in the Cadastre system and is under the authority of the  Cadastral Office of Rethymno (20 Hortatzis Str., ZIP: 74100, Rethymno, Phone n.: 0030-28310-22403)

See also
List of settlements in the Rethymno regional unit

External links 
Photo Gallery, Web site of municipality of Rethymnno retrieved at 9 April 2012
Cycling routes, Web site of Tourism Promotion Committee of Rethymno Prefecture , retrieved at 9 April 2012

References

Populated places in Rethymno (regional unit)